Hisayo Sasaki Momose is a Japanese electrical engineer specializing in semiconductor devices, including MOSFETs and CMOS image sensors. She is a researcher at the Toshiba Center for Semiconductor Research and Development in Kawasaki.

Education and career
Momose is originally from Gifu. She earned a master's degree in chemistry from Ochanomizu University in 1984, and began working for Toshiba in the same year. In 2006 she earned a Ph.D. in electrical engineering from the Tokyo Institute of Technology.

Recognition
Momose was named a Fellow of the IEEE in 2005, "for contributions to ultra-thin gate oxide metal oxide semiconductor field effect transistors". She was named a Fellow of the Japan Society of Advanced Physics in 2009, for her "study on high performance Si CMOS devices".

She was one of a group of Toshiba scientists who won the 2007 Yamazaki-Teiichi Prize, and earned a commendation in 2009 from the Minister of Education, Culture, Sports, Science and Technology, for their work on MOSFET devices.

References

Year of birth missing (living people)
Living people
Japanese electronics engineers
Japanese women engineers
Ochanomizu University alumni
Tokyo Institute of Technology alumni
Fellow Members of the IEEE